Barajally   is a small town in central Gambia. It is located in Niani District in the Central River Division.  As of 2008, it has an estimated population of 878.

It is the birthplace of President Dawda Jawara.

References

External links
Satellite map at Maplandia

Populated places in the Gambia
Central River Division